The Fabulous Voyage of the Angel is a Canadian fantasy comedy film, directed by Jean Pierre Lefebvre and released in 1991. The film stars Daniel Lavoie as Francis, a taxi driver and comic book artist who begins drawing a fantastical comic series about an intergalactic taxi driver in outer space, only to find that the stories he imagines for his comic strip start to materialize in real life. The film also stars Geneviève Grandbois as Francis's daughter Ève, and Marcel Sabourin as his brother Rival.

Lavoie, a prominent singer-songwriter prior to his acting role in the film, also composed the music. Lavoie and Lefebvre received a Genie Award nomination for Best Original Song at the 12th Genie Awards, for "Quand tu partiras".

References

External links
 

1991 films
1990s fantasy comedy films
Canadian fantasy comedy films
1990s French-language films
Films directed by Jean Pierre Lefebvre
Films about comics
1991 comedy films
1990s Canadian films
French-language Canadian films